The Citizens Centre for Freedom and Democracy is a Canadian non-profit organization based in Edmonton, Alberta, claiming to promote responsible government and advocating provincial rights, Senate reform, and judicial restraint.

History 
The Citizens Centre for Freedom and Democracy was established in 2003 by Link Byfield, a journalist and businessman. He is best known as a writer, editor, and publisher of the Alberta Report magazine, and one of Alberta's senators-in-waiting.  Byfield was the centre's founding chairman.  Its operations manager is Craig Docksteader, formerly of the Canadian Taxpayers Federation.

In October 2006, the centre hosted the Calgary Congress, which explored Canadian federalism.  Attendees included Preston Manning, Ralph Klein, Jason Kenney, and separatist Leon Craig.  The congress concluded by advocating a rebalancing of confederation in conformation, making provinces fully responsible for their own internal social and economic affairs, the advocacy of an elected Senate to represent and protect the provinces, and the creation of counterbalances against centralizing tendencies and against expanding influence of Canada's Charter of Rights and Freedoms.

Principles 
The Citizens Centre for Freedom and Democracy promotes government that act with the following characteristics.

Honest government - Honest government is self-policing, transparent, open, respectful and impartial.
Accountable government - Accountable government is democratic. All public policies set by courts and cabinets are subjected to approval, scrutiny and amendment by the elected representatives of the people, or by referendum.
Constitutional government - Constitutional government is self-restrained, confining its activities and taxation to the responsibilities laid down by the Constitution Acts.

Entry into politics
In June 2007, the Citizens Centre decided to abandon its earlier decision to remain a non-partisan lobby group and instead to enter the political arena by forming the socially- and politically-conservative Wildrose Alliance Party.

External links
The Citizens Centre for Freedom and Democracy, November 2007

Political advocacy groups in Canada
Conservatism in Canada
2003 establishments in Alberta
Organizations established in 2003